Drollinger is a surname.  Notable people with the surname include:

D'Arcy Drollinger (born 1969), American actor, producer, and nightclub owner
Ralph Drollinger (born 1954), American basketball player and clergyman

See also
Dollinger